The Tumas Group is a real estate and development company in Malta, founded in the 1970s by Tumas Fenech (deceded 1st February 1999). The group is today headed by Raymond (Ray) Fenech. Tumas Group is active in online gaming, hospitality and leisure, management, property development, and transport and energy.

History 

The Group’s turnover for 2011 was in excess of €112 million.

In 2015 Antony Fenech exited the group and founded his own TUM Invest Group, reataining the automotive and healthcare arms of the Tumas Group.

Yorgen Fenech was a director of Tumas Groupd and of energy company Electrogas; in 2019 he resigned from both positions. On 25 November 2019 Tumas Group said that allegations linking Fenech to the murder of Daphne Caruana Galizia were "alien to the Tumas Group's values".

Companies

Property development 

 Crystal Ship Portomaso
 Mill Street complex, Qormi
 Qormi Construction
 Ta' Monita Estates
 Tas-Sellum Residence
 The Laguna Portomaso
 The Portomaso Business Tower
 The Quad Central, Mriehel

Hospitality and leisure 

 Amazonia Beach Lido
 Blue Elephant
 Dolmen Resort Hotel, Qawra
 Hilton Evian-les-Bains
 Hilton Malta, in Portomaso Tower
 Hilton Malta Conference Centre
 Oracle Conference Centre
 Twenty Two Club

Gaming 
 Portomaso Casino, opened July 2006
 Oracle Casino, opened 1998 within Dolmen Hotel Resort, Qawra
 Tumas Gaming, managing Bestplay outlets across Malta since 2012.

Energy and Transports 

Electrogas: Tumas Group holds 35.16% shares of GEM Holdings which owns 33.34% of Electrogas.
Valletta Gateway Terminal

From July 2011 until 2014, Tumas Group was the minority shareholder (33%), together with Arriva, of a ten-year concession to operate all scheduled bus services on Malta and Gozo. Following years of losses, on 1 January 2014 Arriva ceased operations in Malta, with the services nationalised by the Maltese government as Malta Public Transport.

Management 

 Tumas Fenech Foundation for Education in Journalism 
 Tumas investments, finance company since 2000

References 

Companies of Malta
Construction and civil engineering companies